Cadmoselite is a rare cadmium selenide mineral with chemical formula CdSe. Cadmoselite crystallizes in the hexagonal system and occurs as black to pale grey opaque crystals and grains.

It was first described in 1957 for an occurrence in Tuva. The mineral occurs as interstitial grains in sandstone formed under reducing alkaline diagenetic conditions.

References

Emsley, John. Nature's Building Blocks. Oxford, 2001. 

Cadmium minerals
Selenide minerals
Hexagonal minerals
Minerals in space group 186